The Rába is a river in southeastern Austria and western Hungary and a right tributary of the Danube.

Geography
Its source is in Austria, some kilometres east of Bruck an der Mur below Heubodenhöhe Hill. It flows through the Austrian states of Styria and Burgenland, and the Hungarian counties of Vas and Győr-Moson-Sopron. It flows into a tributary of the Danube (Mosoni-Duna) in northwestern Hungary, in the city of Győr. Towns along the Rába include Gleisdorf, Feldbach (both in Austria), and Szentgotthárd and Körmend (in Hungary). In the early Cenozoic the river used to flow in the opposite direction, but tectonic uplift reversed this flow.

Name
The Rába was attested as Latin Arrabo and Greek Arabon in antiquity, as Raba and Hrapa in AD 791, and as ad Rapam in 890. The various modern names of the river are derived from the Romance reflex Rābo. The name is probably Indo-European, but its origin is unknown.

Rába Slovenes
The Rába Slovenes, living in the Rába Valley (Sln. Porabje, Hung. Vendvidék), are the westernmost group of Hungarian Slovenes. The Raba Valley is part of the wider region of Prekmurje.

References

Rivers of Hungary
Rivers of Burgenland
Rivers of Styria
International rivers of Europe
Graz Highlands
Rivers of Austria
Ramsar sites in Hungary